The Eurovision Song Contest 2019 was the 64th edition of the Eurovision Song Contest. It took place in Tel Aviv, Israel, following the country's victory at the 2018 contest with the song "Toy" by Netta. Organised by the European Broadcasting Union (EBU) and host broadcaster Israeli Public Broadcasting Corporation (IPBC/Kan), the contest was held at Expo Tel Aviv, and consisted of two semi-finals on 14 and 16 May, and a final on 18 May 2019. The three live shows were presented by Israeli television presenters Erez Tal, Assi Azar and Lucy Ayoub, and Israeli model Bar Refaeli.

Bulgaria cited financial difficulties as the reason for its absence, while Ukraine, which had originally planned to participate, ultimately withdrew as a result of a controversy surrounding its national selection.

Further down the table,  and  achieved their best results to date, finishing 7th and 19th respectively.  finished 23rd in the final, making it the fourth time that the host country ranked in the bottom five since .

The EBU reported that the contest had an audience of 182 million viewers in 40 European markets, a decrease of 4 million viewers from the previous edition. However, an increase of two percent in the 15–24 year old age range was reported.

The lead-up to the contest was met with controversy on multiple fronts, primarily on issues surrounding the Israeli–Palestinian conflictthis eventually led to demonstrations by interval act performer Madonna and Icelandic entrants Hatari during the broadcast of the final.

Location

The 2019 contest took place in Tel Aviv, Israel, following the country's victory at the 2018 edition with the song "Toy", performed by Netta Barzilai. The selected venue was Expo Tel Aviv's 7,300-seat congress and convention centre in "Bitan 2" (Pavilion 2), which was opened in January 2015. Located on Rokach Boulevard in northern Tel Aviv, the convention centre serves as a venue for many events, including concerts, exhibitions, trade fairs, and conferences. The fairground has ten halls and pavilions, plus a large outdoor space. The new pavilion had recently hosted the 2018 European Judo Championships from 26 to 28 April.

Bidding phase

After Israel's victory in the 2018 contest in Lisbon, Portugal, Netta Barzilai and the Israeli Prime Minister Benjamin Netanyahu stated that the 2019 contest would be held in Jerusalem, but this was yet to be confirmed by the Israeli Public Broadcasting Corporation (IPBC/Kan) and the European Broadcasting Union (EBU). Israeli finance minister Moshe Kahlon also said in an interview the event would be held solely in Jerusalem and estimated its cost at 120 million Israeli shekels (approximately €29 million). The mayor of Jerusalem, Nir Barkat, mentioned Jerusalem Arena and Teddy Stadium as possible venues to host the event. The municipality of Jerusalem confirmed that because it lacked the seating capacity, the contest would not be held at the International Convention Centre, which had hosted the contest in 1979 and 1999.

On 18 June 2018, Netanyahu stated that Israel had committed to remaining in compliance with EBU rules regarding the constitution of member broadcasters, so as not to affect its hosting of Eurovision. Kan's establishment included a condition that news programming would be delegated later to a second public broadcasting entity. This would have violated EBU rules requiring member broadcasters to have their own internal news departments.

The following day, Israel was officially confirmed as the host country, and on 24 June 2018, Kan formally opened the bidding process for cities interested in hosting the 2019 contest. Israeli deputy minister Michael Oren stated that Jerusalem did not have the resources to host the contest on 28 July, reiterating that Tel Aviv was the more likely host.

Soon afterwards, reports surfaced of the government not providing the €12 million downpayment requested by Kan to cover hosting expenses and security. Following a tense back-and-forth between Kan and the government, a compromise between the two parties was reached on 29 July 2018 that would see Kan paying the €12 million to the EBU and the Finance Ministry covering expenses should complications arise. The mayor of Tel Aviv, Ron Huldai, announced that the city would be willing to pay for the convention centre itself, should it be chosen as the host city.

In the week of 27 August 2018, executive supervisor Jon Ola Sand led a handful of EBU delegates around Israel to look at potential venues in Jerusalem and Tel Aviv and to hear the bid from Eilat. On 30 August 2018, Sand stated in an interview with Kan that Eilat was no longer in the running to host, leaving  Jerusalem and Tel Aviv as the remaining cities in the running. He added that there was no serious discussion among members of the EBU about boycotting the event.

On 13 September 2018, the EBU announced Tel Aviv as the host city, with Expo Tel Aviv as the chosen venue for the 2019 contest.

Key:

 Host venue
 Shortlisted venues

Other sites 

Located at the Charles Clore Park in Tel Aviv, the Eurovision Village was the official Eurovision Song Contest fan and sponsors' area during the events week. It was open from 12 to 18 May 2019. There it was possible to watch performances by local artists, as well as the live shows broadcast from the main venue.

The EuroClub was located at Hangar 11 in Tel Aviv Port and was the venue for the official after-parties and private performances by contest participants. Unlike the Eurovision Village, access to the EuroClub was restricted to accredited fans, delegates, and press.

The "Orange Carpet" event, where the contestants and their delegations are presented before the accredited press and fans, took place at Habima Square in central Tel Aviv on 12 May 2019, followed by the Opening Ceremony at the Charles Bronfman Auditorium.

Format

Visual design
The contest's slogan, "Dare to Dream", was unveiled on 28 October 2018, while the official logo and branding were revealed on 8 January 2019. Designed by Awesome Tel Aviv and Studio Adam Feinberg, it consists of layered triangles designed to resemble a star, reflecting "the stars of the future" coming to Tel Aviv.

Postcards
Filmed between March and April 2019, and directed by Keren Hochma, the 2019 postcards involved the act travelling to a location in Israel that resembles that of their own country. An imaginary play button circled above the act's head, and, when the act pressed it, they performed a themed dance and threw the play button towards the screen, afterwards, it "flies over" to the stage where the ceiling lit up with their country's flag using augmented reality. The dances in each postcard were wide-ranging and included parkour, ballet and street dance, among other styles. The following locations were used:

 Banias Nature Reserve
 Masada National Park
 Jaffa
 Tel Aviv Bauhaus
 Gan HaShlosha National Park
 Rockefeller Archaeological Museum, Jerusalem
 Mitzpe Ramon
 The Israel Museum, Jerusalem
 Eilat
 Caesarea
 Jerusalem International YMCA
 Tel Aviv Promenade
 Financial District, Ramat Gan
 Tel Aviv Museum of Art
 Acre
 Sea of Galilee
 Van Leer Institute, Jerusalem
 Beit Guvrin National Park
 Beit She'an National Park
 Palm Plantation, Eylot
 Old City, Jerusalem
 Ashdod Port
 Suzanne Dellal Centre for Dance, Tel Aviv
 HaBonim Beach
 Timna Park
 Zichron Yaakov's Wineries
 Mikhmoret Beach
 Mount Arbel
 Carmel Forest
 Judean Desert
 Mishkenot Sha'ananim, Jerusalem
 Dead Sea
 Mount Hermon
 Tower of David, Jerusalem
 Solar Thermal Power Station, Ashalim
 Cherry Blossom, Ein Zivan
 Ruhama Badlands
 Haifa
 Tel Aviv Port
 Charles Bronfman Auditorium
 Bahá'í Gardens, Haifa

Presenters

On 25 January 2019, Kan announced that four presenters would host the three shows: TV hosts Erez Tal (who was also one of the Israeli commentators for the  final) and Assi Azar (who works for the Israeli Channel 12), supermodel Bar Refaeli and Kan host Lucy Ayoub (who was also the Israeli jury spokesperson at the 2018 contest). Tal and Refaeli were the main hosts, while Azar and Ayoub hosted the green room.

Semi-final allocation draw
The draw to determine the participating countries' semi-finals took place on 28 January 2019 at 17:00 CET, at the Tel Aviv Museum of Art. The thirty-six semi-finalists were divided over six pots, based on historical voting patterns as calculated by the contest's official televoting partner Digame. The purpose of drawing from different pots was to reduce the chance of "bloc voting" and to increase suspense in the semi-finals. The ceremony was hosted by contest presenters Assi Azar and Lucy Ayoub, and included the passing of the host city insignia from Duarte Cordeiro, vice mayor of Lisbon (host city of the previous contest) to Ron Huldai, mayor of Tel Aviv.

Voting system
On 30 March 2019, the EBU announced that the presentation of the televoting results during the final would change for the first time since the current voting system was introduced in 2016. The jury results' presentation remained the same with a live spokesperson in each participating country revealing the top song from their national jury that earned 12 points. In a change from previous years, the televoting result was revealed in the order of jury ranking, from the lowest to the highest.

Opening and interval acts

On 8 April 2019, it was confirmed that Madonna would perform three songs during the final. The EBU later revealed they would be "Future" featuring Quavo and "Like a Prayer" and a yet-to-be released song, "Dark Ballet". On 15 April 2019, the EBU released further information about the opening and interval acts.

The first semi-final was opened by Netta Barzilai, performing a new version of her winning song "Toy", and also featured Dana International with "Just the Way You Are". The second semi-final included Shalva Band performing "A Million Dreams" and mentalist Lior Suchard.

The final was opened with the traditional flag parade introducing the 26 finalists, which featured Netta Barzilai, Dana International with "Diva" and "Tel Aviv", Nadav Guedj with "Golden Boy" and Ilanit with "Ey Sham". In the "Switch Song" interval act, five former Eurovision participants were featured: Conchita Wurst performed "Heroes", Måns Zelmerlöw performed "Fuego", Eleni Foureira performed "Dancing Lasha Tumbai", Verka Serduchka performed "Toy", and Gali Atari, together with the four above-mentioned artists, performed her winning song "Hallelujah". Idan Raichel then performed "Bo’ee – Come to Me" together with the Idan Raichel Project. Netta Barzilai later performed her new single "Nana Banana", while actress Gal Gadot also appeared in a short video skit.

Madonna's interval performance in the final was heavily criticised due to her poor vocal showing, and further criticisms were raised when her official YouTube channel uploaded a video of the performance with the vocals auto-tuned. Madonna's representatives at Live Nation were subject to a lawsuit by host broadcaster Kan following the performance.

Participating countries

The EBU initially announced on 7 November 2018 that 42 countries would participate in the contest, with  opting not to participate for financial reasons.

 announced its withdrawal from the contest on 27 February 2019, thereby reducing the number of participating countries to 41.

On 6 March 2019, the EBU confirmed that  would take part for the first time under its new name, instead of the previous name of Former Yugoslav Republic of Macedonia which had been used since the country's debut in 1998.

Returning artists 
The contest featured five representatives who had performed previously as lead vocalists for the same countries. Two of them participated in —Sergey Lazarev represented  and won the semi-final, while Serhat represented  in the semi-final.

On the other hand, previous representatives returned to provide supporting vocals for their own or another country. Mikheil Javakhishvili,  in 2018 as part of Ethno-Jazz Band Iriao, backed Oto Nemsadze. Stig Rästa,  in  alongside Elina Born, backed Victor Crone.
Émilie Satt, who represented  in 2018 as part of Madame Monsieur, backed Bilal Hassani. Destiny Chukunyere, who won the Junior Eurovision Song Contest 2015 for Malta, backed Michela.

Semi-final 1
The first semi-final took place on 14 May 2019 at 22:00 IDT (21:00 CEST). Seventeen countries participated in the first semi-final. Those countries plus ,  and  voted in this semi-final.  was originally allocated to participate in the second half of the semi-final, but withdrew from the contest due to controversy over its national selection. The highlighted countries qualified for the final.

Semi-final 2
The second semi-final took place on 16 May 2019 at 22:00 IDT (21:00 CEST). Eighteen countries participated in the second semi-final. Switzerland was pre-drawn into this semi-final due to scheduling issues. The highlighted countries qualified for the final.

Final
The final took place on 18 May 2019 at 22:00 IDT (21:00 CEST). Twenty-six countries participated in the final, with all forty-one participating countries eligible to vote.

Detailed voting results

Belarusian jury dismissal and incorrect aggregated vote
The Belarusian jury was dismissed following the revelation of their votes in the first semi-final, which is contrary to the rules of the contest. To comply with the contest's voting regulations, the EBU worked with its voting partner, Digame, to create a substitute aggregated result (calculated based on the results of other countries with similar voting records), which was approved by voting monitor Ernst & Young, to determine the Belarusian jury votes for the final. In these results, Israel, which did not receive points from any other jury during the final, received 12 points from Belarus.

However, Twitter user @euro_bruno noted on 19 May that an incorrect substitute Belarusian result was purportedly used during the broadcast of the final. The mistake was later confirmed in a statement issued by the EBU on 22 May. According to the statement, the EBU "discovered that due to a human error an incorrect aggregated result was used. This had no impact on the calculation of points derived from televoting across the 41 participating countries and the overall winner and Top 4 songs of the contest remain unchanged. To respect both the artists and EBU Members which took part, [they wished] to correct the grand final results in accordance with the rules."

The error, a reversal of the Belarusian aggregated votes, led to the bottom ten countries receiving points instead of the top ten. Malta, which had been incorrectly ranked last, would receive Belarus' 12 jury points, and Israel would end up with no jury points. The corrected point totals also changed some rankings: Sweden finished fifth overall instead of Norway, Belarus finished 24th overall instead of Germany, San Marino ended 19th despite losing four points, and North Macedonia won the jury vote instead of Sweden.

The mistake made by the EBU and their voting partner was widely panned by the press. Dutch newspaper Algemeen Dagblad said the EBU had to present the new vote totals "blushing with shame", calling the situation "chaos". British newspaper Metro thought the EBU had "screwed up", while the Daily Mirror named the accidental reversal of the aggregated vote total a "scandalous blunder".

The corrected results have been used in all following scoreboards (where applicable).

Semi-final 1

12 points 
Below is a summary of the maximum 12 points awarded by each country's professional jury and televote in the first semi-final. Countries in bold gave the maximum 24 points (12 points apiece from professional jury and televoting) to the specified entrant.

Semi-final 2

12 points 
Below is a summary of the maximum 12 points awarded by each country's professional jury and televote in the second semi-final. Countries in bold gave the maximum 24 points (12 points apiece from professional jury and televoting) to the specified entrant.

Final

12 points 
Below is a summary of the maximum 12 points awarded by each country's professional jury and televote in the final. Countries in bold gave the maximum 24 points (12 points apiece from professional jury and televoting) to the specified entrant.

Spokespersons 
The spokespersons announced the 12-point score from their respective country's national jury in the following order:

 
 Faig Aghayev
 Ben Camille
 Nikola Trajkovski
 Monica Fabbri
 Emma Wortelboer
 Ajda Šufta
 Kelly Sildaru
 Mateusz Szymkowiak
 Alexander Rybak
 Nieves Álvarez
 Philipp Hansa
 Rylan Clark-Neal
 
 Andri Xhahu
 
 Doina Stimpovschi
 Sinéad Kennedy
 Maria Vasilevich
 Aram Mp3
 Ilinca
 Hovig
 Electric Fields
 Ivan Bessonov
 Barbara Schöneberger
 
 Eric Saade
 Monika Lelas Halambek
 
 
 Jóhannes Haukur Jóhannesson
 Gaga Abashidze
 Gus G
 Laura Rizzotto
 
 Rasmussen
 
 
 Sinplus
 Lea Sirk
 Izhar Cohen

Other countries

Eligibility for potential participation in the Eurovision Song Contest requires a national broadcaster with active EBU membership that will be able to broadcast the contest via the Eurovision network. The EBU issued an invitation to participate in the contest to all active members. The Israeli minister of communications, Ayoob Kara, also invited other countries from the MENA region. With some Israel largely had tense relationships and others no diplomatic relations at all. Kara pointed out that Tunisia and the Gulf states, including Saudi Arabia and the United Arab Emirates, were invited. Tunisia is eligible to participate but has not due to rules banning the promotion of Israeli content, while the Gulf states do not have national broadcasters with EBU membership.

Active EBU members
  – Despite being absent for 10 years, local media reported that Ràdio i Televisió d'Andorra (RTVA) was still interested in returning to the contest, but the principality's failure to make the final along with the cost was discouraging the broadcaster from participating. For a return to take place, RTVA would need funding from the Andorran Government. On 19 May 2018, Andorra confirmed that they would not return in 2019.
  – On 25 May 2018, the Bosnian broadcaster, Radio and Television of Bosnia and Herzegovina (BHRT), announced that it would not be participating in 2019, stating that the country would not be allowed to return to the contest until debt-related sanctions placed on them by the EBU are lifted.
  – Despite confirming their preliminary participation in the 2019 contest, Bulgarian National Television (BNT) announced on 13 October 2018 that many members of the delegation were moving onto other projects, and on 15 October 2018, BNT announced that they would withdraw from the 2019 contest because of financial difficulties.
  – On 31 May 2018, the Slovak broadcaster Rozhlas a televízia Slovenska (RTVS) announced that the country would not return to the contest in 2019 due to financial difficulties.
  – Prime Minister Binali Yıldırım said in an interview that Turkey had no plans to return to the contest.
  – On 27 February 2019, UA:PBC announced the withdrawal of the country from the contest, due to the controversy surrounding its national selection. Despite this, the channel still broadcast the show.

Associate EBU members
  – On 22 December 2017, the Ministry of Culture and Sport claimed that Channel 31 had finalised negotiations with the EBU, allowing Kazakhstan to debut in 2019; however, on 23 December 2017, the EBU stated that "Channel 31 Kazakhstan has indeed expressed interest in becoming a member of the EBU and hence participate in the Eurovision Song Contest. However, since Channel 31 is outside the European Broadcasting Area and is also not a member of the Council of Europe, it is not eligible to become an active member of the EBU." On 25 July 2018, it was announced that Kazakhstan would participate in the Junior Eurovision Song Contest 2018, thus making a debut in 2019 possible. On 30 July 2018, the EBU stated that the decision to invite Kazakhstan was made solely by the Junior Eurovision Steering Group, and there were no current plans to invite associate members other than Australia. On 22 November 2018, Jon Ola Sand said in a press conference that "we need to discuss if we can invite our associate member Kazakhstan to take part in adult ESC in the future, but this is part of a broader discussion in the EBU and I hope we can get back to you on this issue later." However, he later clarified that Kazakhstan was not going to have an entry in the 2019 edition.

Non-EBU members

  – In June 2018, RTK general director Mentor Shala said that they were pushing for full membership to still be able to take part in the 2019 contest. However, in December 2018, RTK's membership vote was delayed until June 2019.
  – On 4 November 2017, 1 Fürstentum Liechtenstein Television (1 FL TV), the national broadcaster of the Principality of Liechtenstein, confirmed that the country were planning a debut in the 2019 contest, and that they were applying for EBU membership and are "in [the] process of complying all requirements". They also reiterated their intention to select the participant through a national selection process in the form of Liechtenstein Music Contest. However, on 20 July 2018, the EBU stated that 1 FL TV had not applied for membership. On 26 July 2018, 1 FL TV confirmed that Liechtenstein would not debut at the 2019 contest due to the sudden death of the broadcaster's director, Peter Kölbel.

Broadcasts 

Countries may add commentary from commentators working on-location or remotely at the broadcaster. Commentators can add insight to the participating entries and the provision of voting information.

The European Broadcasting Union provided international live streams of both semi-finals and the final through their official YouTube channel with no commentary. The live streams were geo-blocked to viewers in Bolivia, Canada, Costa Rica, Dominican Republic, Ecuador, El Salvador, Guatemala, Honduras, Nicaragua, Panama, Paraguay, Uruguay, United States and Venezuela due to rights limitations. After the live broadcasts, all three shows were made available for every country listed above, except the United States and Canada.

Incidents

Religious requests
On 14 May 2018, Yaakov Litzman, leader of the ultra-Orthodox party United Torah Judaism and Israel's former Minister of Health, drafted a letter to the Ministers of Tourism, Communications, and Culture and Sports, in which he requested the event not violate religious laws: "In the name of hundreds of thousands of Jewish citizens from all the populations and communities for whom Shabbat observance is close to their hearts, I appeal to you, already at this early stage, before production and all the other details of the event has begun, to be strict [in ensuring] that this matter does not harm the holiness of Shabbat and to work in every way to prevent the desecration of Shabbat, God forbid, as the law and the status quo requires". According to Jewish religious law, Shabbat is observed from just before sunset on Friday evening until Saturday night. The Saturday evening broadcast of the show, which were to start at 22:00 local time, would not conflict with this. However, the Friday evening jury show and Saturday afternoon rehearsals would. The chairman of the Eurovision Song Contest Reference Group (the contest's executive board), Dr. Frank-Dieter Freiling, noted that he was well aware of the tension, and had plans to address it in his communications with host broadcaster Kan. Shalva Band, who performed as the interval act during the second semi-final, withdrew from Israel's national final citing similar concerns on possibly performing during Shabbat in the rehearsals for the final, should they have won.

Calls for boycott 

The possibility of Jerusalem being the venue for an Israeli-hosted contest led many proponents of the Boycott, Divestment and Sanctions (BDS) movement to call on their national broadcasters to boycott the competition because of Israel's policies towards Palestinians in the West Bank and Gaza. This included members of the Australian Greens party, Sinn Féin, Sweden's Left Party and many entertainers including 1994 contest winner Charlie McGettigan. The Icelandic broadcaster RÚV met to discuss a boycott in response to a petition of 23,000 signatures, but ultimately neither RÚV nor any other broadcaster withdrew from the contest in response to boycott calls. In the event, viewing figures for the contest dropped to the joint lowest level since 2013.

Several national selections were disrupted by BDS supporters calling for a boycott in the lead-up to the contest. The EBU later sent a special letter to all participating broadcasters advising precautions they could take to prevent similar disruptions. An opinion piece in Sweden's largest newspaper Aftonbladet, calling for a boycott of the contest and other cultural exchanges with Israel, was signed by 171 Swedish professionals in the cultural sector.

In March 2019, LGBT activist groups Al Qaws and Pinkwatching Israel called for a boycott of the contest in opposition to Israeli "pinkwashing". In late April, over 100 celebrities including Stephen Fry and Sharon Osbourne signed a joint statement against boycotting Eurovision in Israel, asserting that any cultural boycott would be antithetical to advancing peace in the region.

Late Ukrainian withdrawal

Following Maruv's win, it was reported the broadcaster had sent a contract to her management, requiring her to cancel all upcoming appearances and performances in Russia to represent Ukraine. She was also given 48 hours to sign the contract or be replaced.

On 24 February 2019, Maruv revealed the contract sent to her by UA:PBC had also banned her from improvising on stage and communicating with any journalist without the permission of the broadcaster, and required her to fully comply with any requests from the broadcaster. Later, the broadcaster published a statement explaining every entry of the contract. If she failed to follow any of these clauses, she would be fined ₴2 million (~€65,500). Maruv also said the broadcaster would not give her any financial compensation for the competition and would not pay for her trip to Tel Aviv.

On 25 February 2019, both Maruv and UA:PBC confirmed she would not represent Ukraine in the contest due to disputes over the contract, and that another act would be chosen. National final runner-up Freedom Jazz announced on 26 February they had also rejected the broadcaster's offer to represent Ukraine as did third-place finisher Kazka the following day. The incident garnered media coverage from major international outlets, including The New York Times, The Washington Post, Billboard, The Telegraph, The Independent, SBS News, The Irish Independent, Le Figaro, Cosmopolitan, and ABC. On 27 February, UA:PBC announced its withdrawal from the contest.

Ticket sales controversy 
The ticket prices for the year's event sparked criticism, both in Israel and abroad, with The Times of Israel calling them "likely the most expensive ever for Eurovision". Explanations for the high prices included the high cost of living in Israel and the fact that the Israeli government was not subsidising the Eurovision production. Although the venue could hold up to 10,000 people, only 7,300 seats were available because of the size of the stage, the technical equipment and the security features. Of those 7,300 seats, 3,000 had been reserved for the EBU, leaving only 4,300 for fans so that demand exceeded supply.

On 3 March 2019, ticket sales were frozen because of irregularities noticed by the Oversight Committee of Kan. Hebrew-language Israeli media reported tickets being illegally resold for more than twice their original price. Public Security Minister Gilad Erdan ordered an investigation into the situation.

On 14 March 2019, tickets sales resumed. According to Kan, 220 improperly-purchased tickets to the final live show were revoked and were sold again in the second round of ticket sales.

Technical issues

Cyber attack during semi-final 1 
Kan suffered a cyber attack by a group of hackers that affected the broadcaster's accessibility livestreams of the first semi-final. The hackers were able to briefly show anti-Israeli statements on the streams such as "Israel is not safe, you will see" and "Risk of missile attack, please take shelter". The incident was investigated by both the broadcaster and the EBU. Kan released a statement regarding the incident saying: "The problem was fixed quickly, and it seems that during the first semi-finals a site was hacked here for a few minutes, and we believe that the messages were not seen by many people."

Semi-final 1 technical issues 
Multiple broadcasters around Europe reported various issues during the live broadcast of the first semi-final. Viewers reported a loss of commentary from Tel Aviv in the Netherlands and North Macedonia. The Polish public broadcaster, TVP, had to replace their regular commentator Artur Orzech who was in Tel Aviv with another person who was based in Warsaw because viewers were unable to hear Orzech. Germany and the United Kingdom lost a portion of the show. On BBC Four, which broadcast the semi-finals in the UK, the programme cut out as the recap of the qualifiers of the first semi-final began to play, and was replaced by the message "We are sorry for the break in this programme and are trying to correct the fault" while the French broadcaster France Télévisions experienced audio issues during the Portuguese and Belgian performances.

Keiino's jury final performance 
During Norway's jury final performance, two technical issues occurred in a short time. The screen turned black while Keiino performed their song "Spirit in the Sky". When the picture returned the camera operator was seen in the picture. NRK complained to the EBU and requested a new run through, but the EBU rejected the complaints.

Jury vote issues

Following the reveal of the detailed jury voting, it emerged that three jurors appeared to have voted backwards in their semi-finals. In the first semi-final, Czech juror Jitka Zelenková ranked Portugal as her favourite entry, Slovenia as her least-favourite entry, and ranked Estonia as fourteenth on her list; this was directly opposite to the other Czech jurors, who all ranked Slovenia first and two who ranked Portugal last. In the final, Zelenková's rankings changed significantly; she listed Estonia as her fourth favourite and Slovenia as her sixth favourite. Neither Zelenková, the Czech broadcaster Česká televize (ČT) nor the EBU had confirmed that her semi-final votes were reversed, but if this were corrected, Poland would have qualified to the final instead of Belarus.

Swedish juror Lina Hedlund also appeared to have voted backwards in the second semi-final. She ranked the Netherlands and Switzerland as her favourite entries in the final, but ranked them as her two least-favourite entries in the semi-final. Additionally, Hedlund ranked Austria her favourite entry in the semi-final, which led Austria to receive eight points from Sweden. Neither Hedlund, the Swedish broadcaster Sveriges Television (SVT) nor the EBU had commented on the incident.

The second semi-final also seemed to have had Russian juror Igor Gulyaev casting his votes in reverse order. In the semi-final, Gulyaev ranked Denmark first and Azerbaijan last, although he reversed these placements in the final. He also ranked Albania as his second least favourite entry in the semi-final, but conversely as his second favourite in the final. If his and Hedlund's votes were corrected, it would have had no impact on the result other than minor differences in the number of points received by each country.

This was the second year in which a juror accidentally submitted their votes backwards.

Political demonstrations during the final 
The organisation of the Eurovision Song Contest in Israel faced protests due to the ongoing Israeli–Palestinian conflict, and not exclusively outside the venue.

During Madonna's interval performance in the final where she sang "Like a Prayer" and "Future", the singer directed a monologue (part of her song "Dark Ballet") to backup dancers wearing gas masks between the two songs, alluding to the "[storm] inside of us", saying "they think we are not aware of their crimes. We know, but we're just not ready to act". This was interpreted as a reference to the conflict. During "Future", two dancers—one wearing an Israeli, the other a Palestinian flag on the back of their costumes—were seen holding each other while guest vocalist Quavo sang the lyrics: "Not everyone is coming to the future, not everyone is learning from the past". Madonna later stated that the use of Israeli and Palestinian flags was not a pro-Palestine demonstration, but a call for unity and peace.

While receiving their points from the televotes, members of the Icelandic entry Hatari were seen showing banners that included the Palestinian flag. There had previously been concerns that the self-described anti-capitalist group would use their performance to protest the Israeli occupation of Palestinian territory, and the band had previously received warnings from the EBU about statements they had made prior to the contest. Following the flag incident, the EBU stated that "the consequences of this action will be discussed by the Reference Group after the Contest". Hatari subsequently announced a collaboration with Palestinian artist Bashar Murad for their next single. The Icelandic broadcaster RÚV was eventually handed a -fine for the incident. The incident was retained on the official replay of the final on YouTube, but was edited out on the official DVD release.

Other awards
In addition to the main winner's trophy, the Marcel Bezençon Awards and the Barbara Dex Award were contested during the 2019 Eurovision Song Contest. The OGAE, "General Organisation of Eurovision Fans" voting poll also took place before the contest.

Marcel Bezençon Awards
The Marcel Bezençon Awards, organised since 2002 by Sweden's then-Head of Delegation and 1992 representative Christer Björkman, and 1984 winner Richard Herrey, honours songs in the contest's final. The awards are divided into three categories: Artistic Award, Composers Award, and Press Award. The winners were revealed shortly before the Eurovision final on 18 May.

OGAE
OGAE, an organisation of over forty Eurovision Song Contest fan clubs across Europe and beyond, conducts an annual voting poll first held in 2002 as the Marcel Bezençon Fan Award. After all votes were cast, the top-ranked entry in the 2019 poll was Italy's "" performed by Mahmood; the top five results are shown below.

Barbara Dex Award
The Barbara Dex Award is a humorous fan award given each year to the artist who wore the most notable outfit. First awarded in 1997, the award originally highlighted the worst-dressed artists in the competition, until this criterion was changed in 2019. Named after Belgium's representative who came last in the 1993 contest, wearing her self-designed dress, the award was handed by the fansite House of Eurovision from 1997 to 2016 and is being carried out by the fansite Songfestival.be since 2017.

Official album
Eurovision Song Contest: Tel Aviv 2019 is the official compilation album of the contest, put together by the European Broadcasting Union and released by Universal Music Group digitally on 12 April 2019 and physically on 26 April 2019. The album features all 41 entries including the semi-finalists that failed to qualify for the final.

Charts

See also
 Eurovision Choir 2019
 Junior Eurovision Song Contest 2019

Notes

References

External links

 
2019
Music festivals in Israel
2019 song contests
2019 in Israel
2019 television specials
May 2019 events in Europe
Events in Tel Aviv
Boycott, Divestment and Sanctions
Music controversies
Television controversies